The European System of Financial Supervision (ESFS) is the framework for financial supervision in the European Union that has been in operation since 2011. The system consists of the European Supervisory Authorities (ESAs), the European Systemic Risk Board, the Joint Committee of the European Supervisory Authorities, and the national supervisory authorities of EU member states. It was proposed by the European Commission in 2009 in response to the financial crisis of 2007–08.

There are three European Supervisory Authorities (ESAs). They are responsible for microprudential oversight at the European Union level:
 The European Banking Authority (EBA) in Paris;
 The European Securities and Markets Authority (ESMA) in Paris; and
 The European Insurance and Occupational Pensions Authority (EIOPA) in Frankfurt.

To complement these authorities, the European Systemic Risk Board (ESRB) is responsible for macroprudential oversight across the European Union. It includes representatives from the European Central Bank, national central banks and supervisory authorities of EU member states, and the European Commission. The ESRB is based at the ECB in Frankfurt.

History
The European Parliament, in September 2010, backed a deal to set up the European System of Financial Supervision replacing the Committees of Supervisors. The deal set up the EBA in London, ESMA in Paris and EIOPA in Frankfurt, after an initial agreement reached between the European Commission and member states in December 2009 had triggered parliamentary criticisms. The three institutions began operations on 1 January 2011 and replaced the Committees of Supervisors.

 The EBA replaced the Committee of European Banking Supervisors;
 ESMA replaced the Committee of European Securities Regulators; and
 EIOPA replaced the Committee of European Insurance and Occupational Pensions Supervisors.

See also
 Financial regulation
Capital Markets Union
Banking Union

References

Further reading
 Regulation (EU) No 1092/2010
 Larosière report
 Commission, European financial supervision (2009)

External links
 Financial Supervision European Commission
 European System of Financial Supervision (ESFS) European Parliament
 European Supervisory Framework ESMA
 European Supervisory Authorities (ESAs) Financial Conduct Authority (United Kingdom)
 European engagement and legislation Bank of England

European Union financial market policy
Finance in the European Union
Financial regulatory authorities
Policy and political reactions to the Eurozone crisis

sv:Europeiska systemet för finansiell tillsyn